"Queen of My Double Wide Trailer" is a song written by Dennis Linde, and recorded by American country music artist Sammy Kershaw. It was released in August 1993 as the third single from his album Haunted Heart. It peaked at No. 7 in the United States, and No. 3 in Canada.

American Aquarium covered the song on their 2021 album Slappers, Bangers, and Certified Twangers: Vol 1.

Content
The song is a mid-tempo in shifting meters (4/4 and 11/4 time) about a man who, upon losing his lover to a man named Earl, arrives to take her back. Kershaw said that peers had tried to convince him that audiences would be unable to identify with the song, but later pointed out that "Somebody must have identified with it. In fact, this song singlehandedly sold hundreds of thousands of albums".

Music video
The music video premiered in October 1993, and was directed by Michael Merriman.

Charts
"Queen of My Double Wide Trailer" debuted at number 72 on the U.S. Billboard Hot Country Singles & Tracks for the week of September 4, 1993.

Year-end charts

References

1993 singles
1993 songs
Sammy Kershaw songs
Songs written by Dennis Linde
Song recordings produced by Buddy Cannon
Song recordings produced by Norro Wilson
Mercury Records singles